"Guns, Guns, Guns" is a popular rock and roll song written by Burton Cummings recorded by the Canadian rock group The Guess Who for the album [[Rockin' (The Guess Who album)|Rockin''']].  It is also included on their 1974 compilation album The Best of the Guess Who, Vol. 2.

The single release spent six weeks on the Billboard Hot 100 peaking at #70 during the week of June 10, 1972. The song also reached #58 in Canada.

Cummings did a remake of the song on his 1978 solo album Dream of a Child''.

References

1972 songs
1972 singles
Songs written by Burton Cummings
The Guess Who songs
Song recordings produced by Jack Richardson (record producer)
RCA Victor singles